Robley may refer to:

People

Given name
Robley Dunglison (1798–1869), English physician
Robley D. Evans (admiral) (1846–1912), United States Navy rear admiral
Robley D. Evans (physicist) (1907–1995), American physicist
Robley Rex (1901–2009), World War II-era veteran
Robley S. Rigdon, retired Georgia Army National Guard brigadier general
Robley C. Williams (1908–1995), American biologist and virologist
Robley Wilson (1930–2018), American poet, writer, and editor

Middle name
Charles Robley Evans (1866–1954), American politician
Geoffrey Robley Sayer (1887–1962), British civil servant and historian

Surname
Horatio Gordon Robley (1840–1930), British soldier, artist, and collector of the macabre

Other
Robley, Virginia, an unincorporated community
Rob R. Robley, one of Robbie Rotten's disguises in LazyTown